Thailand participated in the 2007 Asian Winter Games which were held in Changchun, China from January 28, 2007, to February 4, 2007.

References

Nations at the 2007 Asian Winter Games
Asian Winter Games
Thailand at the Asian Winter Games